Adelia is a genus of flowering plants in the spurge family, Euphorbiaceae, subfamily Acalyphoideae. It is native to Latin America and the Caribbean, with one species extending northward into the southernmost part of Texas.

The name is derived from the Greek words α (a), meaning "not", and δήλος (delos), meaning "visible." It refers to the difficulties Linnaeus experienced interpreting the genus.

Species
Current species include
 Adelia barbinervis Cham. & Schltdl. – hairynerve adelia - Mexico, N Central America
 Adelia brandegeei V.W.Steinm. - Baja California Sur, Sonora
 Adelia cinerea (Wiggins & Robbins) A.Cerv., V.W.Steinm. & Flores-Olvera - Sonora
 Adelia membranifolia (Müll.Arg.) Chodat & Hassl. - Brazil, Bolivia, Paraguay, NE Argentina
 Adelia oaxacana (Müll.Arg.) Hemsl. – Oaxaca Adelia - most of Mexico from San Luis Potosí + Sinaloa to Chiapas + Quintana Roo
 Adelia obovata Wiggins & Robbins - Sonora, Sinaloa
 Adelia panamensis Pax & K.Hoffm. - Panama
 Adelia ricinella L. – Wild Lime - West Indies, Venezuela, Colombia
 Adelia triloba (Müll.Arg.) Hemsl. – threelobe adelia - Central America, Colombia, Ecuador, Venezuela
 Adelia vaseyi (Coult.) Pax & K.Hoffmann – Vasey's wild lime - Tamaulipas, S Texas (Starr, Hidalgo, Cameron, + Willacy Counties)

Formerly included species (including in Oleaceae homonym) moved to other genera, including (Alchornea, Bernardia, Doryxylon, Erythrococca, Flueggea, Forestiera (Oleaceae), Garciadelia, Homonoia, Lasiocroton, Macaranga, Mallotus, and Spathiostemon )

References

External links

USDA Plants Profile for Adelia species

Adelieae
Euphorbiaceae genera
Flora of the Caribbean
Flora of Central America
Flora of North America
Flora of South America
Taxa named by Carl Linnaeus